Gothibang is a town and Village Development Committee in Pyuthan, a Middle Hills district of Rapti Zone, western Nepal.

Etymology

In Khamkura Gothi is a small, primitive mine.  Bang means a field or pasture, high enough for the climate to be temperate, subalpine or even alpine.

Villages in VDC

References

External links
UN map of VDC boundaries, water features and roads in Pyuthan District

Populated places in Pyuthan District